Town Planning Associates was a design firm in New York City, active between 1942 and 1959, which included Paul Lester Wiener, Paul Schulz, Josep Lluis Sert. The firm produced urban design and city planning in various new or existing South American cities including Bogotá, Chimbote in Peru, and Havana. Sert's master plan for Havana, Havana Plan Piloto, was notable for its integration of natural landscape into new urban and existing building schemes. Town Planning Associates made prominent use of patios and other aspects of Mediterranean architecture adapted to South and Central America. They employed modernist principles of the Congrès Internationaux d'Architecture Moderne (CIAM) and the Athens Charter. The charter got its name from the location of the fourth CIAM conference in 1933, which, due to the deteriorating political situation in Russia, took place on the SS Patris II bound for Athens from Marseilles. This conference was documented in a film commissioned by Sigfried Giedion and made by his friend László Moholy-Nagy "Architects' Congress." The Charter had a significant impact on urban planning after World War II and, through Josep Lluis Sert and Paul Lester Wiener, especially on the proposed modernization of Havana.

History

Wiener joined José Luis Sert in 1942 to form Town Planning Associates which operated until 1959, when they finished the Havana Plan Piloto, as an architectural, urban planning, and site planning consultant firm. During this period, Wiener and Sert lectured in the United States and Latin America as experts in urban planning. 
Their designs exhibited elements of the "functional city" doctrine that Town Planning Associates promoted the Congrès Internationaux d'Architecture Moderne (CIAM), an organization founded by modern movement architects in 1928. The doctrine was codified in a document called the Athens Charter, drafted at CIAM's fourth meeting in 1933 in Greece. 

It also promoted ideas of GATEPAC (Grupo de Artistas y Técnicos Españoles Para la Arquitectura Contemporánea) the Spanish branch of C.I.A.M.
Writing in reference to the writings of Josep Lluís Sert, Joan Ockman notes:

Gallery

See also

Havana Plan Piloto
Josep Lluís Sert

Paul Lester Wiener
Mario Romañach
Jean-Claude Nicolas Forestierl
Congrès Internationaux d'Architecture Moderne

GATEPAC

Laws of the Indies
Cartography of Latin America

References

External links

 Architects' Congress (Trailer)
 Town Planning Associates Directias Generles_Miami Libraries Digital Collections
 Paul Lester Wiener papers, 1913-1968
«La arquitectura contemporánea en España», Cahiers d'Art, 1931, n.º 3, págs. 157-164  (in Spanish)
 «Gatepac y movimiento moderno». In Artehistoria.
 «A.C. La revista del GATEPAC (1931-1937) en el Museo Reina Sofía», Revista de Arte Logopress
 Museo Nacional Centro de Arte Reina Sofía, «A.C. La revista del GATEPAC». Pamphlet from an exhibition 29 October 2008 – 5 January 2009
 Plan Piloto de La Havana

Neoclassical architecture in Cuba
Land use
Legal codes
Urban planning by country
 
Architecture groups
Modernist architecture
Modernist architects
Urban planning organizations
Architectural theory
Arts organizations established in 1942
Organizations disestablished in 1942